The Ministry of Fisheries (Māori: Te Tautiaki i nga tini a Tangaroa), also known by its acronym MFish, was a state sector organisation of New Zealand whose role is ensuring the sustainable utilisation of fisheries. It was merged into the Ministry of Primary Industries in April 2012. Its purpose was conserving, using, enhancing and developing New Zealand's fisheries resources.

History

The Ministry of Fisheries was established as a stand-alone agency in 1995, after a major governmental review of fisheries legislation, as well as ongoing reforms in the New Zealand State Sector. Previously, responsibility for fisheries belonged to New Zealand Ministry of Agriculture and Forestry (MAF), which later became New Zealand's Ministry of Agriculture and Forestry when the Ministry of Forestry merged with the remaining Ministry of Agriculture in 1998. Under the Fifth National Government, the Ministry of Fisheries was merged back into MAF from 1 July 2011, and then into the Ministry for Primary Industries (MPI) in 2012.

The subsequent Labour-led government has announced it would break up MPI and has re-established the portfolio of Minister of Fisheries. However, MPI was not disestablished; instead, it was restructured with Fisheries New Zealand established as a new business group within the larger agency.

Responsibilities
The Ministry was primarily responsible for fisheries management within New Zealand's  Exclusive Economic Zone (EEZ). It aimed to ensure that fisheries are sustainably used within a healthy aquatic ecosystem. MFish also undertook fisheries research to provide information needed to determine how many fish and other marine organisms (of various species) could be safely taken while ensuring the sustainability of the resource.

See also
 Aquaculture in New Zealand
 Fishing industry in New Zealand
 Minister of Fisheries (New Zealand)

Notes
1. Budget 2008/09 (excl GST) MFish Facts and Figures. 
2. Staff (March 2008)(FTEs) MFish Facts and Figures. 
3.

References

External links
 Ministry for Primary Industries	 - Fisheries
 NZ Fisheries InfoSite - It provides information on our fisheries and marine environment, explains how fisheries are managed for long-term sustainability, and describes New Zealands fisheries in a global context.
 NABIS - Provides spatial & visual representations of New Zealand marine biological & fisheries management data.
 Starfish - An online learning resource for teachers and students.
 Fishing Rules - Provides fishing rules for the New Zealand recreational fishery management areas.
 New Zealand Fisheries Management Research Database - Available for research & analysis of NZ fisheries management information.

Fisheries
Nature conservation in New Zealand
New Zealand
Specialist law enforcement agencies of New Zealand
Ministries established in 1995
Ministries disestablished in 2013